Razliv railway station is a railway station located near to Lake Razliv which is in the territory of Saint Petersburg, Russia.

It was built by the Joint-stock company of the Primorskaya St.-Peterburg-Sestroretsk railway. 
The station was opened on November 26, 1894, when the Primorskaya line was extended from Razdelnaya station to Sestroretsk.

Notable changes
In 1952, the line was electrified and high platforms were constructed at the same time.

References 

Railway stations in the Russian Empire opened in 1894
Railway stations in Saint Petersburg